Li Yunqi (born August 28, 1993) is a Chinese swimmer. He competed at the 2012 Summer Olympics in the Men's 200 metre freestyle, finishing in 23rd place in the heats, failing to qualify for the semifinals.

See also
China at the 2012 Summer Olympics - Swimming

References

Swimmers from Henan
1993 births
Living people
Chinese male freestyle swimmers
Olympic swimmers of China
Swimmers at the 2012 Summer Olympics
Olympic bronze medalists for China
Olympic bronze medalists in swimming
People from Zhengzhou
Place of birth missing (living people)
Asian Games medalists in swimming
Swimmers at the 2010 Asian Games
Swimmers at the 2014 Asian Games
Medalists at the 2012 Summer Olympics
World Aquatics Championships medalists in swimming
Asian Games gold medalists for China
Asian Games silver medalists for China
Asian Games bronze medalists for China
Medalists at the 2010 Asian Games
Medalists at the 2014 Asian Games
21st-century Chinese people